Balan is a commune in the Ardennes department in the Grand Est region of northern France.

The inhabitants of the commune are known as Balanais or Balanaises.

The commune has been awarded three flowers by the National Council of Towns and Villages in Bloom in the Competition of cities and villages in Bloom.

Geography
Balan is located just east of Sedan and north-east of Bazeilles. Access to the commune is by the D8043A road from Sedan which continues south-east to Bazeilles. The D17 also passes through the town and continues east to Rubécourt-et-Lamécourt. The Route nationale N43 (E46) highway passes through the commune with the nearest exit being Exit  just south-east of the commune. Much of the central area of the commune is urban with the northern part farmland and some forest.

The Meuse river forms the south-western border of the commune as it flows north through Sedan.

Neighbouring communes and villages

History
From 1560 to 1642 Balan was part of the Principality of Sedan.

Heraldry

Administration
List of Successive Mayors

Mayors from 1995

Demography
In 2017 the commune had 1,618 inhabitants.

Culture and heritage

Civil heritage
The commune has several buildings and sites that are registered as historical monuments:
The Bonhomme Spinning Mill (Now a Community Hall) (19th century)
The Godchaux Weaving Mill (Now a Warehouse) (20th century)
The Stackler Textile Works (Now a Business incubator) (19th century)
The Bazaille Chard Plant (1906)

Notable people linked to the commune
Jean-Baptiste Herbin-Dessaux (1765-1832): French General of the Revolution and the Empire, died at Balan.
Élisabeth Lion (1904-1988), French aviator, born at Balan.

See also
Communes of the Ardennes department

References

External links

Balan on the old National Geographic Institute website 
Balan on the 1750 Cassini Map

Communes of Ardennes (department)